Henry Graham Greene  (2 October 1904 – 3 April 1991) was an English writer and journalist regarded by many as one of the leading English novelists of the 20th century. 

Combining literary acclaim with widespread popularity, Greene acquired a reputation early in his lifetime as a major writer, both of serious Catholic novels, and of thrillers (or "entertainments" as he termed them). He was shortlisted for the Nobel Prize in Literature several times. Through 67 years of writing, which included over 25 novels, he explored the conflicting moral and political issues of the modern world. He was awarded the 1968 Shakespeare Prize and the 1981 Jerusalem Prize.

He converted to Catholicism in 1926 after meeting his future wife, Vivien Dayrell-Browning. Later in life he took to calling himself a "Catholic agnostic".
He died in 1991, aged 86, of leukemia, and was buried in Corseaux cemetery.

Early years (1904–1922) 

Henry Graham Greene was born in 1904 in St John's House, a boarding house of Berkhamsted School, Hertfordshire, where his father was house master. He was the fourth of six children; his younger brother, Hugh, became Director-General of the BBC, and his elder brother, Raymond, an eminent physician and mountaineer.

His parents, Charles Henry Greene and Marion Raymond Greene, were first cousins, both members of a large, influential family that included the owners of Greene King Brewery, bankers, and statesmen; his mother was cousin to Robert Louis Stevenson.
Charles Greene was second master at Berkhamsted School, where the headmaster was Dr Thomas Fry, who was married to Charles' cousin. Another cousin was the right-wing pacifist Ben Greene, whose politics led to his internment during World War II.

In his childhood, Greene spent his summers with his uncle, Sir Graham Greene, at Harston House in Cambridgeshire. In Greene's description of his childhood, he describes his learning to read there: "It was at Harston I found quite suddenly I could read—the book was Dixon Brett, Detective. I didn't want anyone to know of my discovery, so I read only in secret, in a remote attic, but my mother must have spotted what I was at all the same, for she gave me Ballantyne's The Coral Island for the train journey home—always an interminable journey with the long wait between trains at Bletchley…"

In 1910, Charles Greene succeeded Dr Fry as headmaster of Berkhamsted. Graham also attended the school as a boarder. Bullied and profoundly depressed, he made several suicide attempts, including, as he wrote in his autobiography, by Russian roulette and by taking aspirin before going swimming in the school pool. In 1920, aged 16, in what was a radical step for the time, he was sent for psychoanalysis for six months in London, afterwards returning to school as a day student. School friends included Claud Cockburn the journalist, and Peter Quennell the historian.

Greene contributed several stories to the school magazine, one of which was published by a London evening newspaper in January 1921.

Oxford University
He attended Balliol College, Oxford, to study history. During 1922 Greene was for a short time a member of the Communist Party of Great Britain, and sought an invitation to the new Soviet Union, of which nothing came. In 1925, while he was an undergraduate at Balliol, his first work, a poorly received volume of poetry titled Babbling April, was published.

Greene suffered from periodic bouts of depression while at Oxford, and largely kept to himself. Of Greene's time at Oxford, his contemporary Evelyn Waugh noted that: "Graham Greene looked down on us (and perhaps all undergraduates) as childish and ostentatious. He certainly shared in none of our revelry." He graduated in 1925 with a second-class degree in history.

Writing career 
After leaving Oxford, Greene worked as a private tutor and then turned to journalism; first on the Nottingham Journal, and then as a sub-editor on The Times. While he was working in Nottingham, he started corresponding with Vivien Dayrell-Browning, who had written to him to correct him on a point of Catholic doctrine. Greene was an agnostic, but when he later began to think about marrying Vivien, it occurred to him that, as he puts it in A Sort of Life, he "ought at least to learn the nature and limits of the beliefs she held". Greene was baptised on 26 February 1926 and they married on 15 October 1927 at St Mary's Church, Hampstead, London.

He published his first novel, The Man Within, in 1929; its favourable reception enabled him to work full-time as a novelist. Greene originally divided his fiction into two genres (which he described as "entertainments" and "novels"): thrillers—often with notable philosophic edges—such as The Ministry of Fear; and literary works—on which he thought his literary reputation would rest—such as The Power and the Glory.

The next two books, The Name of Action (1930) and Rumour at Nightfall (1932), were unsuccessful; and he later disowned them. His first true success was Stamboul Train (1932) which was taken on by the Book Society and adapted as the film Orient Express, in 1934.

Although Greene objected strongly to being described as a Roman Catholic novelist, rather than as a novelist who happened to be Catholic, Catholic religious themes are at the root of much of his writing, especially Brighton Rock, The Power and the Glory, The Heart of the Matter, and The End of the Affair; which have been named "the gold standard" of the Catholic novel. Several works, such as The Confidential Agent, The Quiet American, Our Man in Havana, The Human Factor, and his screenplay for The Third Man, also show Greene's avid interest in the workings and intrigues of international politics and espionage.

He supplemented his novelist's income with freelance journalism, book and film reviews for The Spectator, and co-editing the magazine Night and Day. Greene's 1937 film review of Wee Willie Winkie, for Night and Day—which said that the nine-year-old star, Shirley Temple, displayed "a dubious coquetry" which appealed to "middle-aged men and clergymen"—provoked Twentieth Century Fox successfully to sue for £3,500 plus costs, and Greene leaving the UK to live in Mexico until after the trial was over. While in Mexico, Greene developed the ideas for the novel often considered his masterpiece, The Power and the Glory.

By the 1950s, Greene had become known as one of the finest writers of his generation.

As his career lengthened, both Greene and his readers found the distinction between his 'entertainments' and novels increasingly problematic. The last book Greene termed an entertainment was Our Man in Havana in 1958.

Greene also wrote short stories and plays, which were well received, although he was always first and foremost a novelist. His first play, The Living Room, debuted in 1953.

Michael Korda, a lifelong friend and later his editor at Simon & Schuster, observed Greene at work: Greene wrote in a small black leather notebook with a black fountain pen and would write approximately 500 words. Korda described this as Graham's daily penance—once he finished he put the notebook away for the rest of the day.

His writing influences included Conrad, Ford, Haggard, Stevenson, James, Proust, Buchan, and Péguy.

Travel and espionage 

Throughout his life, Greene travelled to what he called the world's wild and remote places. In 1941, the travels led to his being recruited into MI6 by his sister, Elisabeth, who worked for the agency. Accordingly, he was posted to Sierra Leone during the Second World War. Kim Philby, who would later be revealed as a Soviet agent, was Greene's supervisor and friend at MI6. Greene resigned from MI6 in 1944. Greene later wrote an introduction to Philby's 1968 memoir, My Silent War. As a novelist Greene wove the characters he met and the places where he lived into the fabric of his novels.

Greene first left Europe at 30 years of age in 1935 on a trip to Liberia that produced the travel book Journey Without Maps. His 1938 trip to Mexico to see the effects of the government's campaign of forced anti-Catholic secularisation was paid for by the publishing company Longman, thanks to his friendship with Tom Burns. That voyage produced two books, the factual The Lawless Roads (published as Another Mexico in the US) and the novel The Power and the Glory. In 1953, the Holy Office informed Greene that The Power and the Glory was damaging to the reputation of the priesthood; but later, in a private audience with Greene, Pope Paul VI told him that, although parts of his novels would offend some Catholics, he should ignore the criticism.

Greene first travelled to Haiti in 1954, where The Comedians (1966) is set, which was then under the rule of dictator François Duvalier, known as "Papa Doc", frequently staying at the Hotel Oloffson in Port-au-Prince. And, in the late 1950s, as inspiration for his novel, A Burnt-Out Case (1960), Greene spent time travelling around Africa visiting a number of leper colonies in the Congo Basin and in what were then the British Cameroons. During this trip in late February and early March 1959, Greene met several times with Andrée de Jongh, a leader in the Belgian resistance during WWII, who famously established an escape route to Gibraltar through the Pyrenees for downed allied airmen.

In 1957, just months after Fidel Castro began his final revolutionary assault on the Batista regime in Cuba, Greene played a small role in helping the revolutionaries, as a secret courier transporting warm clothing for Castro's rebels hiding in the hills during the Cuban winter. Greene was said to have a fascination with strong leaders, which may have accounted for his interest in Castro, whom he later met. After one visit Castro gave Greene a painting he had done, which hung in the living room of the French house where the author spent the last years of his life. Greene did later voice doubts about Castro, telling a French interviewer in 1983, "I admire him for his courage and his efficiency, but I question his authoritarianism," adding: "All successful revolutions, however idealistic, probably betray themselves in time."

Publishing career 

Between 1944 and 1948, Greene was director at Eyre & Spottiswoode under chairman Douglas Jerrold, in charge of developing its fiction list. Greene created The Century Library series, which was discontinued after he left following a conflict with Jerrold regarding Anthony Powell's contract. In 1958, Greene was offered the position of chairman by Oliver Crosthwaite-Eyre, but declined.

He was a director at The Bodley Head from 1957 to 1968 under Max Reinhardt.

Personal life 

Greene was an agnostic, but was baptised into the Catholic faith in 1926 after meeting his future wife Vivien Dayrell-Browning. They were married on 15 October 1927 at St Mary's Church, Hampstead, north London.  The Greenes had two children, Lucy Caroline (born 1933) and Francis (born 1936).

In his discussions with Father Trollope, the priest to whom he went for instruction in Catholicism, Greene argued with the cleric "on the ground of dogmatic atheism", as Greene's primary difficulty with religion was what he termed the "if" surrounding God's existence. He found, however, that "after a few weeks of serious argument the 'if' was becoming less and less improbable", and Greene was converted and baptised after vigorous arguments initially with the priest in which he defended atheism, or at least the "if" of agnosticism. Late in life, Greene called himself a "Catholic agnostic".

Beginning in 1946, Greene had an affair with Catherine Walston, the wife of Harry Walston, a wealthy farmer and future life peer. That relationship is generally thought to have informed the writing of The End of the Affair, published in 1951, when the relationship came to an end. Greene left his family in 1947, but Vivien refused to grant him a divorce, in accordance with Catholic teaching, and they remained married until Greene's death in 1991.

Greene lived with manic depression (bipolar disorder).  He had a history of depression, which had a profound effect on his writing and personal life. In a letter to his wife, Vivien, he told her that he had "a character profoundly antagonistic to ordinary domestic life," and that "unfortunately, the disease is also one's material". William Golding praised Greene as "the ultimate chronicler of twentieth-century man's consciousness and anxiety".

Final years 

Greene left Britain in 1966, moving to Antibes, to be close to Yvonne Cloetta, whom he had known since 1959, a relationship that endured until his death. In 1973, he had an uncredited cameo appearance as an insurance company representative in François Truffaut's film Day for Night. In 1981, Greene was awarded the Jerusalem Prize, awarded to writers concerned with the freedom of the individual in society.

He lived the last years of his life in Vevey, on Lake Geneva in Switzerland, the same town Charlie Chaplin was living in at this time. He visited Chaplin often, and the two were good friends. His book Doctor Fischer of Geneva or the Bomb Party (1980) is based on themes of combined philosophical and geographical influences. He ceased going to mass and confession in the 1950s, but in his final years began to receive the sacraments again from Father Leopoldo Durán, a Spanish priest, who became a friend.

In one of his final works, a pamphlet titled J'Accuse: The Dark Side of Nice (1982), Greene wrote of a legal matter that embroiled him and his extended family in Nice, and declared that organised crime flourished in Nice because the city's upper levels of civic government protected judicial and police corruption. The accusation provoked a libel lawsuit that Greene lost; but he was vindicated after his death when, in 1994, the former mayor of Nice, Jacques Médecin, was imprisoned for corruption and associated crimes.

Death 
In 1984, in celebration of his 80th birthday, the brewery which Greene's great-grandfather founded in 1799 made a special edition of its St. Edmund's Ale for him, with a special label in his honour. Commenting on turning 80, Greene said, "The big advantage ... is that at 80 you are more likely these days to beat out encountering your end in a nuclear war," adding, "the other side of the problem is that I really don't want to survive myself [which] has nothing to do with nukes, but with the body hanging around while the mind departs."

In 1986, Greene was awarded Britain's Order of Merit. He died of leukaemia in 1991 at the age of 86. and was buried in Corseaux cemetery.

Writing style and themes 

Greene originally divided his fiction into two genres: thrillers (mystery and suspense books), such as The Ministry of Fear, which he described as entertainments, often with notable philosophic edges; and literary works, such as The Power and the Glory, which he described as novels, on which he thought his literary reputation was to be based.

As his career lengthened, both Greene and his readers found the distinction between "entertainments" and "novels" to be less evident. The last book Greene termed an entertainment was Our Man in Havana in 1958. When Travels with My Aunt was published eleven years later, many reviewers noted that Greene had designated it a novel, even though, as a work decidedly comic in tone, it appeared closer to his last two entertainments, Loser Takes All and Our Man in Havana, than to any of the novels. Greene, they speculated, seemed to have dropped the category of entertainment. This was soon confirmed. In the Collected Edition of Greene's works published in 22 volumes between 1970 and 1982, the distinction between novels and entertainments is no longer maintained. All are novels.

Greene was one of the more "cinematic" of twentieth-century writers; most of his novels and many of his plays and short stories have been adapted for film or television. The Internet Movie Database lists 66 titles between 1934 and 2010 based on Greene material. Some novels were filmed more than once, such as Brighton Rock in 1947 and 2011, The End of the Affair in 1955 and 1999, and The Quiet American in 1958 and 2002. The 1936 thriller A Gun for Sale was filmed at least five times under different titles, notably This Gun for Hire in 1942. Greene received an Academy Award nomination for the screenplay for the 1948 Carol Reed film The Fallen Idol, adapted from his own short story The Basement Room. He also wrote several original screenplays. In 1949, after writing the novella as "raw material", he wrote the screenplay for a classic film noir, The Third Man, also directed by Carol Reed, and featuring Orson Welles. In 1983, The Honorary Consul, published ten years earlier, was released as a film under its original title, starring Michael Caine and Richard Gere. Author and screenwriter Michael Korda contributed a foreword and introduction to this novel in a commemorative edition.

In 2009, The Strand Magazine began to publish in serial form a newly discovered Greene novel titled The Empty Chair. The manuscript was written in longhand when Greene was 22 and newly converted to Catholicism.

Greene's literary style was described by Evelyn Waugh in Commonweal as "not a specifically literary style at all. The words are functional, devoid of sensuous attraction, of ancestry, and of independent life". Commenting on the lean prose and its readability, Richard Jones wrote in the Virginia Quarterly Review that "nothing deflects Greene from the main business of holding the reader's attention". Greene's novels often have religious themes at their centre. In his literary criticism he attacked the modernist writers Virginia Woolf and E. M. Forster for having lost the religious sense which, he argued, resulted in dull, superficial characters, who "wandered about like cardboard symbols through a world that is paper-thin". Only in recovering the religious element, the awareness of the drama of the struggle in the soul that carries the permanent consequence of salvation or damnation, and of the ultimate metaphysical realities of good and evil, sin and divine grace, could the novel recover its dramatic power. Suffering and unhappiness are omnipresent in the world Greene depicts; and Catholicism is presented against a background of unvarying human evil, sin, and doubt. V. S. Pritchett praised Greene as the first English novelist since Henry James to present, and grapple with, the reality of evil. Greene concentrated on portraying the characters' internal lives—their mental, emotional, and spiritual depths. His stories are often set in poor, hot and dusty tropical places such as Mexico, West Africa, Vietnam, Cuba, Haiti, and Argentina, which led to the coining of the expression "Greeneland" to describe such settings.

The novels often portray the dramatic struggles of the individual soul from a Catholic perspective. Greene was criticised for certain tendencies in an unorthodox direction—in the world, sin is omnipresent to the degree that the vigilant struggle to avoid sinful conduct is doomed to failure, hence not central to holiness. His friend and fellow Catholic Evelyn Waugh attacked that as a revival of the Quietist heresy. This aspect of his work also was criticised by the theologian Hans Urs von Balthasar, as giving sin a mystique. Greene responded that constructing a vision of pure faith and goodness in the novel was beyond his talents. Praise of Greene from an orthodox Catholic point of view by Edward Short is in Crisis Magazine, and a mainstream Catholic critique is presented by Joseph Pearce.

Catholicism's prominence decreased in his later writings. The supernatural realities that haunted the earlier work declined and were replaced by a humanistic perspective, a change reflected in his public criticism of orthodox Catholic teaching.

In his later years, Greene was a strong critic of American imperialism and sympathised with the Cuban leader Fidel Castro, whom he had met. Years before the Vietnam War, he prophetically attacked the idealistic but arrogant beliefs of The Quiet American, whose certainty in his own virtue kept him from seeing the disaster he inflicted on the Vietnamese. In Ways of Escape, reflecting on his Mexican trip, he complained that Mexico's government was insufficiently left-wing compared with Cuba's. In Greene's opinion, "Conservatism and Catholicism should be ... impossible bedfellows".

In 1949, when the New Statesman held a contest for parodies of Greene's writing style, he submitted an entry under the name "N. Wilkinson" and won second prize. His entry comprised the first two paragraphs of a novel, apparently set in Italy, The Stranger's Hand: An Entertainment. Greene's friend Mario Soldati, a Piedmontese novelist and film director, believed it had the makings of a suspense film about Yugoslav spies in postwar Venice. Upon Soldati's prompting, Greene continued writing the story as the basis for a film script. Apparently he lost interest in the project, leaving it as a substantial fragment that was published posthumously in The Graham Greene Film Reader (1993) and No Man's Land (2005). A script for The Stranger's Hand was written by Guy Elmes on the basis of Greene's unfinished story, and filmed by Soldati in 1954. In 1965, Greene again entered a similar New Statesman competition pseudonymously, and won an honourable mention.

Legacy 

Greene is regarded as a major 20th-century novelist, and was praised by John Irving, prior to Greene's death, as "the most accomplished living novelist in the English language". Novelist Frederick Buechner called Greene's novel The Power and the Glory a "tremendous influence". By 1943, Greene had acquired the reputation of being the "leading English male novelist of his generation", and at the time of his death in 1991 had a reputation as a writer of both deeply serious novels on the theme of Catholicism, and of "suspense-filled stories of detection".

Acclaimed during his lifetime, Greene was shortlisted for the Nobel Prize in Literature several times. In 1961 and 1966 he was among the final three candidates for the prize. In 1967, Greene was again among the final three choices, according to Nobel records unsealed on the 50th anniversary in 2017. The committee also considered Jorge Luis Borges and Miguel Ángel Asturias, with the latter the chosen winner. Greene remained a favourite to win the Nobel prize in the 1980s, but it was known that two influential members of the Swedish Academy, Artur Lundkvist and Lars Gyllensten, opposed the prize for Greene and he was never awarded.

Greene collected several literary awards for his novels, including the 1941 Hawthornden Prize for The Power and the Glory and the 1948 James Tait Black Memorial Prize for The Heart of the Matter.  As an author, he received the 1968 Shakespeare Prize and the 1981 Jerusalem Prize, a biennial literary award given to writers whose works have dealt with themes of human freedom in society.  In 1986, he was awarded Britain's Order of Merit.

The Graham Greene International Festival is an annual four-day event of conference papers, informal talks, question and answer sessions, films, dramatised readings, music, creative writing workshops and social events. It is organised by the Graham Greene Birthplace Trust, and takes place in the writer's home town of Berkhamsted (about 35 miles northwest of London), on dates as close as possible to the anniversary of his birth (2 October). Its purpose is to promote interest in and study of the works of Graham Greene.

He is the subject of the 2013 documentary film, Dangerous Edge: A Life of Graham Greene.

His short story "The Destructors" was featured in the 2001 film Donnie Darko.

Select works 

 The Man Within (début—1929)
 Stamboul Train (1932) (also published as Orient Express in the US)
 It's a Battlefield (1934)
 England Made Me (also published as The Shipwrecked) (1935)
 A Gun for Sale (1936)
 Journey Without Maps (1936)
 Brighton Rock (1938)
 The Lawless Roads (1939) (also published as Another Mexico in the US)
 The Confidential Agent (1939)
 The Power and the Glory (1940)
 The Ministry of Fear (1943)
 The Heart of the Matter (1948)
 The Third Man (1949) (novella written as a preliminary to Greene's screenplay for the film The Third Man)
 The End of the Affair (1951)
 Twenty-One Stories (1954) (short stories)
 Loser Takes All (1955)
 The Quiet American (1955)
 The Potting Shed (1956)
 Our Man in Havana (1958)
 A Burnt-Out Case (1960)
 In Search of a Character: Two African Journals (1961)
 The Comedians (1966)
 Travels with My Aunt (1969)
 A Sort of Life (1971)
 The Honorary Consul (1973)
 The Human Factor (1978)
 Ways of Escape (1980)
 Doctor Fischer of Geneva (1980)
 Monsignor Quixote (1982)
 Getting To Know The General: The Story of an Involvement (1984)
 The Tenth Man (1985)
 The Last Word (1990) (short stories)

References

Citations

Works cited 

 Bosco, Mark, 2005. Graham Greene's Catholic Imagination. Oxford University Press.
 Diederich, Bernard, 2012. Seeds of Fiction: Graham Greene's Adventures in Haiti and Central America 1954–1983. Peter Owen
 Diemert, Brian, 1996. Graham Greene's Thrillers and the 1930s. McGill-Queen's Press
 Donaghy, Henry J., 1983. Graham Greene, an Introduction to His Writings. Rodopi
 Feldman, Burton, 2001.The Nobel Prize: A History of Genius, Controversy, and Prestige. Arcade Publishing
 Kohn, Lynette, 1961. Graham Greene: The Major Novels. Stanford University Press
 Iyer, Pico, 2012. The Man within My Head: Graham Greene, My Father and Me. Bloomsbury.
 Schwartz, Adam, 2005. The Third Spring: G.K. Chesterton, Graham Greene, Christopher Dawson, and David Jones. CUA Press
 Steensma, Robert C., 1997, Encyclopedia of the Essay. Taylor & Francis
 Theroux, Paul, 2004. Introduction to The Comedians. Random House
 Vickers, Graham, 2008. Chasing Lolita: How Popular Culture Corrupted Nabokov's Little Girl All Over Again. Chicago Review Press

 Further reading 

 Graham Greene Studies (journal), University of North Georgia - Digital Commons, bepress,  Elsevier
 Allain, Marie-Françoise, 1983. The Other Man: Conversations with Graham Greene. Bodley Head.
 Bergonzi, Bernard, 2006. A Study in Greene: Graham Greene and the Art of the Novel. Oxford University Press.
 Cloetta, Yvonne, 2004. In Search of a Beginning: My Life with Graham Greene, translated by Euan Cameron. Bloomsbury.
 Fallowell, Duncan, 20th Century Characters, Loaded: Graham Greene at home in Antibes (London, Vintage Books, 1994)
 Greene, Richard, editor, 2007. Graham Greene: A Life in Letters. Knopf Canada.
 Hazzard, Shirley, 2000. Greene on Capri. Farrar, Straus & Giroux.
 Henríquez Jiménez, Santiago J.   La realidad y la construcción de la ficción en la novelística de Graham Greene, La Laguna: Universidad, 1992.
 Henríquez Jiménez, Santiago J. "Graham Greene's novels seen in the Light of His Religious Discourse" en Wm. Thomas Hill (ed.). Perceptions of Religious Faith in the Work of Graham Greene. Oxford, New York...: Peter Lang. 2002. 657–685.
 Henríquez Jiménez, Santiago J. “Don Quijote de la Mancha y Monsignor Quixote: la inspiración castellana de Grahan Greene en el clásico español de Cervantes” en José Manuel Barrio Marco y María José Crespo Allué (eds.). La huella de Cervantes y del Quijote en la cultura anglosajona. Centro Buendía y Universidad de Valladolid. Valladolid. 2007. 311–318.
 Henríquez Jiménez, Santiago J. “Miguel de Unamuno y Graham Greene: coincidencias en torno a los cuidados de la fe” en Teresa Gibert Maceda y Laura Alba Juez (coord..). Estudios de Filología Inglesa. Homenaje a la Dra. Asunción Alba Pelayo. Madrid: UNED. 2008. 421–430.
 Phillips, Gene D., 1974. Graham Greene: Films of His Fiction, Teachers' College Press.
 O'Prey, Paul, 1988. A Reader's Guide to Graham Greene. Thames and Hudson.
 Shelden, Michael, 1994. Graham Greene: The Enemy Within. William Heinemann. Random House ed., 1995, 
 Sherry, Norman, 1989. The Life of Graham Greene: Vol. 1, 1904–1939. Random House UK, . Viking, . Penguin reprint 2004, 
 Sherry, Norman, 1994. The Life of Graham Greene: Vol. 2, 1939–1955. Viking. . Penguin reprint 2004: 
 Sherry, Norman, 2004. The Life of Graham Greene: Vol. 3, 1955–1991''. Viking. 

 Simon Raven & Martin Shuttleworth 

 Bernhard Valentinitsch,Graham Greenes Roman 'The Human Factor'(1978) und Otto Premingers gleichnamige Verfilmung (1979). In:JIPSS (= Journal for Intelligence,Propaganda and Security),Nr.14.Graz 2021,p. 34-56.

External links 

 
 
 
 
 Graham Greene Papers at the Harry Ransom Center
 Graham Greene Papers at John J. Burns Library, Boston College
 Graham Greene Collection at Emory University
 Graham Greene Letters at Columbia University
 Bryan Forbes Collection of Graham Greene at the British Library
 The Cherry Record Collection of Josephine Reid’s Papers and Books Relating to Graham Greene at Balliol College Archives & Manuscripts

 
1904 births
1991 deaths
20th-century British short story writers
20th-century English dramatists and playwrights
20th-century English screenwriters
20th-century English novelists
20th-century English memoirists
20th-century essayists
Alumni of Balliol College, Oxford
British emigrants to Switzerland
British male dramatists and playwrights
Christian novelists
Commandeurs of the Ordre des Arts et des Lettres
Converts to Roman Catholicism from atheism or agnosticism
Deaths from cancer in Switzerland
Deaths from leukemia
Edgar Award winners
English dramatists and playwrights
English essayists
English expatriates
English male journalists
English male novelists
English male screenwriters
English male short story writers
English Roman Catholic writers
English Roman Catholics
English short story writers
English spy fiction writers
English travel writers
Fellows of the Royal Society of Literature
James Tait Black Memorial Prize recipients
Jerusalem Prize recipients
Male essayists
Members of the Order of Merit
Members of the Order of the Companions of Honour
People educated at Berkhamsted School
People from Berkhamsted
People from Harston
People with bipolar disorder
Secret Intelligence Service personnel
World War II spies for the United Kingdom
Writers from Hertfordshire
English expatriates in Switzerland
English pamphleteers